The Graphic Arts Show Company is an industry association in the United States.  
It was formed in 1982 by an agreement between three industry associations, the National Association for Printing Leadership (NAPL), NPES The Association for Suppliers of Printing, Publishing, and Converting Technologies (NPES), and Printing Industries of America. GASC aims to provide an effective forum through shows and conferences to meet the marketing requirements of the graphic communications and converting industries.
 
Shortly after creating the Graphic Arts Show Company, NPES, NAPL and the Printing Industries of America jointly formed the Graphic Arts Education and Research Foundation to channel a portion of the show revenue into education and research programs to benefit the industry.  The first GASC contribution to the foundation, made in early 1984, was the largest single contribution ever made to graphic arts education.

The Graphic Arts Show Company is managed by a nine-member Board of Directors.  NPES’ Chairman also serves as Chairman of the Graphic Arts Show Company; NPES’ President, the top staff person, heads the Show Company staff; NAPL’s representative serves as Treasurer; and, the Printing Industries of America’s representative serves as Secretary.

GRAPH EXPO held at McCormick Place on September 11-14, 1983, was the first show GASC-managed, filling more than 275,000 net square feet of exhibit space.

External links 
GASC Website

Mass media companies of the United States